Paul Morrison Torrens is a professor in New York University Tandon School of Engineering's Department of Computer Science and Engineering and Center for Urban Science and Progress. He co-authored the book Geosimulation: Automata-Based Modeling of Urban Phenomena.

Torrens was the recipient of a Presidential Early Career Award for Scientists and Engineers from the National Science Foundation in 2007.

References 

American computer scientists
New York University faculty
Year of birth missing (living people)
Living people
Place of birth missing (living people)
Polytechnic Institute of New York University faculty